Eunidia xyliae is a species of beetle in the family Cerambycidae. It was described by Gardner in 1941. It is known from Myanmar.

References

Eunidiini
Beetles described in 1941